The Rural Municipality of King George No. 256 is a rural municipality (RM) in the Canadian province of Saskatchewan within Census Division No. 7 and  Division No. 3.

History 
The RM of King George No. 256 incorporated as a rural municipality on December 11, 1911.

Demographics 

Government 
The RM of King George No. 256 is governed by an elected municipal council and an appointed administrator that meets on the second Tuesday of every month. The reeve of the RM is Norm McIntyre while its administrator is Kelly Dodd. The RM's office is located in Dinsmore.

Transportation 
 Saskatchewan Highway 42
 Saskatchewan Highway 646
 Saskatchewan Highway 751

See also 
List of rural municipalities in Saskatchewan

References 

K